CR Flamengo is a Brazilian football club.

Flamengo may also refer to:

Sports

Brazil
 Associação Atlética Flamengo, a Brazilian football club
 Clube de Regatas Flamengo (RO), a defunct Brazilian football club
 Clube de Regatas do Flamengo (Superleague Formula team), the Superleague formula division of CR Flamengo
 Clube de Regatas do Flamengo (women), the women's section of CR Flamengo
 Flamengo Basketball, the basketball division of CR Flamengo
 Esporte Clube Flamengo, a Brazilian football club
 Esporte Clube Flamengo Paraibano, a Brazilian football club
 Flamengo Esporte Clube, a defunct Brazilian football club
 Flamengo Esporte Clube de Arcoverde, a Brazilian football club
 Flamengo Esportivo Tiradentes de Brasília, a defunct Brazilian football club
 Sport Club Flamengo, a defunct Brazilian football club

Elsewhere (by country)
 Flamengo de Sucre, a Bolivian football club
 Uniao Flamengo Santos F.C., a Botswana football club
 Flamengo de Ngagara, a Burundian football club
 S.D. Flamengo, an Ecuadorian football club

Other
 Flamengo (Czech band), a Czech progressive rock band active from 1966 to 1972
 Flamengo, Rio de Janeiro, a neighborhood located in Rio de Janeiro, Brazil
 Flamengo Park, a leisure area of Rio de Janeiro, Brazil

See also 
 Flamingo (disambiguation)
 Flamenco (disambiguation)
 Fleming (disambiguation)
 Flemish (disambiguation)